Gilboa is an unincorporated community in Nicholas County, West Virginia, United States. Gilboa has a post office with ZIP code 26671.

The community derives its name, directly or indirectly, from Mount Gilboa in Israel.

References

Unincorporated communities in Nicholas County, West Virginia
Unincorporated communities in West Virginia